A villain is an evil person or fictional character.

Villain(s) or The Villain(s) may also refer to:

Books
Villain, a 1971 novel by James Barlow
Villain (Akunin 悪人), a 2010 novel by Shuichi Yoshida
Villain, a 2009 poetry collection by Justin Clemens
Villains, a comic book published by Viper Comics

Film and television

Film
The Villain (1917 film), starring Oliver Hardy
Villain (1971 film), a British gangster film
The Villain (1979 film), a sendup of Westerns, starring Kirk Douglas
Villain (2002 film), an Indian Tamil film directed by K. S. Ravikumar starring Ajith Kumar
Villain (2003 film), an Indian Telugu film directed by K. S. Ravikumar starring Rajasekhar
The Villain (2009 film), a French film
Villain (2010 film) (Akunin), a Japanese film directed by Lee Sang-il
Villain, the Telugu-dubbed version of Raavanan, a 2010 Indian film
Villain (2012 film), an Indian Kannada film
Villain (2013 film), a Bengali film
Ek Villain, a 2014 Indian Hindi film
Villain (2017 film), an Indian Malayalam film
The Villainess, a 2017 Korean film
The Villain (2018 film), an Indian Kannada film
Villains (film), a 2019 comedy horror film
Villain (2020 film), a British film starring Craig Fairbrass

Television 
Villains (TV series), a 1972 UK crime drama
"Villains" (Buffy the Vampire Slayer), a 2002 episode of Buffy the Vampire Slayer
"Villains" (Heroes), a 2008 third-season episode of Heroes
Villains, the third volume of the TV series Heroes, comprising 13 episodes of season 3

Music 
Villains (electronic music group), an American DJ/producer duo

Albums
The Villain (album), by Trick Trick, 2008
Villain (album), by Attila, 2019
Villains (Emma Blackery album), 2018
Villains (Queens of the Stone Age album), 2017
Villains (Stray from the Path album), 2008
Villains (The Verve Pipe album), 1996
Villains (Wolfgang album), 2008
Villains? (album), by The Saw Doctors, 2002

Songs
"Villain", a 2005 song by Hedley from Hedley
"Villain", a 2011 song by Jennifer Lopez from Love?
"Villain", a 2011 song by Theory of a Deadman from The Truth Is...
"Villain", a 2018 song by Speedy Ortiz from Twerp Verse
"Villain", a 2018 song by YoungBoy Never Broke Again from Until Death Call My Name
"Villain", a 2020 song by K/DA from All Out
"Villain", a 2021 song by Deafheaven from Infinite Granite

People
Raoul Villain (1885–1936), French nationalist and assassin of Jean Jaurès
Jacques Villain (born 1934), French physicist
Jean-Paul Villain (born 1946), French long-distance steeplechase runner
François-Xavier Villain (born 1950), French politician
Evan Turner (born 1988), American basketball player, nicknamed "The Villain"
Marty Scurll (born 1988), English professional wrestler, nicknamed "The Villain"

Other uses
Villain (roller coaster), a defunct wooden roller coaster at Geauga Lake in Aurora, Ohio
Villein or villain, a type of serf in the Middle Ages

See also

Villaine (disambiguation)
Villainy (disambiguation)
Villano (disambiguation)
Villon (disambiguation)
Aston Villa F.C., nicknamed "The Villans", an English football club